George W. "Woody" Grimshaw (September 24, 1919 – October 20, 1974) was an American professional basketball player and coach.

Grimshaw played at Brown University in the 1940s, and was the school's first basketball player to score over 1,000 points. He played one season in the Basketball Association of America for the Providence Steamrollers, averaging 2.9 points per game. Though expected to continue playing professional basketball, he stepped on a nail during the summer of 1947 and an anti-tetanus shot left his arm unavailable for use in playing basketball. Grimshaw was approached by the dean of the University of Puerto Rico to become a coach of the basketball team, and Grimshaw coached there from 1947 to 1950. From 1953 to 1971, he coached basketball at Tufts University.

Grimshaw was later inducted into Brown University's Athletic Hall of Fame. The school's Woody Grimshaw Memorial Award is named in his honor. It is presented to the member of the men's basketball team who "[shows] the most positive attitude and the best spirit".

BAA career statistics

Regular season

References

1919 births
1974 deaths
American men's basketball players
Brown Bears men's basketball players
Guards (basketball)
Hartford Hurricanes players
Providence Steamrollers players
Tufts Jumbos men's basketball coaches